The Belmont Historic District is located in Belmont, Ohio and contains several streets. The buildings located in the district are primarily from the 19th century, but are punctuated by more recent buildings. The district is split by SR 147 and SR 149. The historic district was placed on the National Register in 1987.

It was deemed an "architecturally cohesive rural village" and includes hewn log houses, vernacular frame buildings, brick I-houses, and Greek Revival-style houses and commercial buildings.

References

National Register of Historic Places in Belmont County, Ohio
Geography of Belmont County, Ohio
Gothic Revival architecture in Ohio
Historic districts on the National Register of Historic Places in Ohio